Ballez is an American ballet company based in New York City. The company re-stages classical works and produces original ballets to emphasize LGBTQ representation in ballet.

History 
Ballez was founded in 2011 by Katy Pyle, a lesbian and genderqueer dancer, with a focus on creating possibilities, representation, and inclusion for queer dancers within the patriarchal structure of ballet. The creation of Ballez was funded by a grant from the Brooklyn Arts Exchange and was originally an outreach program to provide ballet classes to LGBTQ people that felt disenfranchised in traditional classical dance settings. The company aims to portray and include lesbian, gay, transgender, and queer people in ballet through their performances, public engagement programs, and classes that are open to the public.

Original takes on classical and story ballets that the company has performed include The Firebird, a Ballez, featuring a lesbian princess and a transgender prince, at Dancespace Project in 2013, Variations on Virtuosity, a Gala with the Stars of the Ballez at American Realness at Abrons Arts Center in 2015, and Sleeping Beauty & the Beast, based on historic events in queer history from the 1982 garment workers' strike to the AIDS epidemic in the 1980s and 1990s, at La Mama in 2016. Other original works by the company include Slavic Goddess, which was a collaboration with Paulina Olowska in 2017, and a pas de deux for Kyong H. Park's PILLOWTALK in 2018. In June 2020 the company is scheduled to perform Giselle of Loneliness, a modern take on the classical ballet Giselle where the title character is a gender non-conforming lesbian.

Ballez hosts open adult ballet classes at the Brooklyn Arts Exchange The company offers free YouTube videos of ballet class for people who are not able to take class in New York.

References

Further reading 

 Angyal, Chloe, Turning Pointe: How a New Generation of Dancers Is Saving Ballet from Itself.

2011 establishments in New York City
Arts organizations based in New York City
Ballet companies in the United States
Dance companies in New York City
History of ballet
LGBT arts organizations
LGBT dance
Performing groups established in 2011